The South African Journal of Libraries and Information Science is a biannual academic journal of the Library and Information Association of South Africa. It has been published since 2002.

Former names
 South African Libraries, from 1933
 South African Journal for Librarianship and Information Science, from 1972
 South African Journal of Library and Information Science, from 1984
 The South African Journal of Libraries and Information Science, from 1988 to 2002

References

External links

Library and information science journals
Academic journals published in South Africa
English-language journals
Biannual journals
Open access journals
Creative Commons-licensed journals